Robert B. Dove (October 18, 1938 – July 28, 2021) was a parliamentarian of the United States Senate and a professor of political science at George Washington University.

Early life and education
Dove was born in Hamilton, Ohio and attended Ohio State University (BA, 1960), Duke University (MA, 1963; PhD, 1967) and Georgetown University (JD). He was a professor and lecturer at The Citadel and Iowa State University in the early 1960s.

Career
Dove joined the Parliamentarian's office in 1966. He was named Parliamentarian of the United States Senate in 1981 and remained in this position until he was dismissed by Democratic Majority Leader Robert Byrd in 1987 after the Democratic Party obtained a majority and control of the Senate.  He was replaced by Alan Frumin.

He served on the staff of Senator Robert Dole from 1987 until 1995, when he was again appointed Parliamentarian of the United States Senate. In 2001, he determined that Senate rules allow only one budget bill per year related to revenue to be immune from filibuster. 
Provisions in a reconciliation bill, one provided for in section 310 of the Congressional Budget and Impoundment Control Act of 1974, may be deleted because the Parliamentarian may find it only has policy implications and no budgetary implications, and hence be subject to a point of order. 
Later that year, Dove ruled to remove a Republican provision to allocate over $5 billion in the 2002 budget for natural disasters. 
Following Republican anger about these rulings, he was dismissed  by Republican Majority Leader Trent Lott.
He was again replaced by Alan Frumin.

Upon leaving the United States Senate, he became a professor at The George Washington University, specializing in Congressional issues.

He served as a parliamentary consultant to a number of foreign legislatures, including the State Duma of Russia, the National Assembly of Bulgaria, the Assembly of Representatives of Yemen, the National Assembly of Kuwait, and the Parliament of Poland.

On July 28, 2021, Dove died of congestive heart failure in Charleston, South Carolina.

References

External links

|-

1938 births
2021 deaths
Ohio State University alumni
Duke University alumni
Georgetown University Law Center alumni
Columbian College of Arts and Sciences faculty
Parliamentarians of the United States Senate
People from Hamilton, Ohio